Traverse City is a city in the U.S. state of Michigan. It is the county seat of Grand Traverse County, although a small portion extends into Leelanau County. It is the largest city in the 21-county Northern Michigan region. The population was 15,678 at the 2020 census, with 153,448 in the four-county Traverse City micropolitan area. Traverse City is also the second-largest city in Michigan north of the Tri-Cities, behind Marquette.

Traverse City is located at the head of the East and West arms of Grand Traverse Bay, a  bay of Lake Michigan. Grand Traverse Bay is divided into arms by the  Old Mission Peninsula, which is attached at its base to Traverse City. The city borders four townships–East Bay, Elmwood, Garfield, and Peninsula–all of which contain substantial suburban sprawl.

Traverse City is well-known for being a cherry production hotspot, as the area was  the largest producer of tart cherries in the United States in 2010. The city hosts the National Cherry Festival, attracting approximately 500,000 visitors annually. The area is also known for its viticulture industry, and is one of the centers of wine production in the Midwest. Traverse City is located nearby the Sleeping Bear Dunes National Lakeshore, as well as a number of freshwater beaches, downhill skiing areas, and numerous forests. For these reasons, Traverse City is a year-round tourism hotspot, winning multiple accolades and awards. Traverse City has also been noted as one of Michigan's top LGBT-friendly locations.

History

19th century

Native Americans 
The Traverse City area is home to the Ojibwe, Ottawa, and Potawatomi people. They lived through the European colonization and the establishment of the Northwest Territory. These people groups inhabited the area surrounding the Great Lakes, including Michigan. The Traverse City area was known to Natives as gichi-wiikwedoongsing (Ojibwe: 'at the head of the great bay'), which was often anglicized to Wequetong. This settlement was located near the current-day mouth of the Boardman River, then known as adaawewiziibi (Ojibwe: 'river of trade'), however Wequetong was abandoned upon the advent of European settlement to the region.

European-American settlement 
After the colonists came in, they discovered the Grand Traverse Bay. The bay earned its name from 18th-century French voyageurs who made , or "the long crossing", across the mouth of bay, from present-day Norwood to Northport. The area was owned by the French, followed by Great Britain as the Province of Quebec. After 1776, the area was owned by the Americans. On the Old Mission peninsula, Rev. Peter Doughtery started the first permanent settlement in 1839. This was called "Grand Traverse", and is today known as Old Mission.

In 1847, Captain Horace Boardman of Naperville, Illinois, purchased the land at the mouth of the Boardman River (then known as the Ottawa River) at the head of the west arm of the bay, which at the time was still settled by Natives. During 1847, the captain, his son, and their employees built a dwelling and sawmill near the mouth of the river. In 1851 the Boardmans sold the sawmill to Hannah, Lay & Co (Perry Hannah, Albert Tracy Lay and James Morgan), who improved the mill greatly. The increased investment in the mill attracted additional settlers to the new community. Perry Hannah today is known as the founding father of Traverse City.

In 1851, Grand Traverse County was organized from the previously-designated Omeena County, with the county seat assigned to Boardman's Mills.

Further growth 
As of 1853, the only operating post office in the Grand Traverse Bay region was the one located at Old Mission, which was then known as "Grand Traverse". While in Washington, D.C. in 1852, Mr. Lay had succeeded in getting the U.S. Post Office to authorize a new post office at his newer settlement. As the newer settlement had become known as "Grand Traverse City", after the Grand Traverse Bay, Lay proposed this name for its post office, but the Post Office Department clerk suggested dropping the "Grand" from the name, as to limit confusion between this new office and the one at nearby Old Mission. Mr. Lay agreed to the new, shortened name of "Traverse City" for the post office, and the village took on this name. Also around this time, the first cherry trees were being planted on the Old Mission Peninsula, something the peninsula is widely known for today.

Late 19th century 
In December 1872, rail service arrived in Traverse City via a Traverse City Railroad Company spur from the Grand Rapids and Indiana Railroad line at Walton Junction. The railroad tracked along the Boardman River and along Boardman Lake into Traverse City, and ended at a station along the Grand Traverse Bay, at the corner of present-day Grandview Parkway and Park Street. This new line of transportation from Southern Michigan opened up the area to settlement and industrial development. Many more people started flocking to the small community, and in 1881, Traverse City was incorporated as a village. This began the major commercial growth of the town.

In 1890, another rail line was extended to Traverse City, this one from Baldwin via Copemish and Interlochen. This line primarily served lumber companies, such as the Buckley & Douglas Lumber Company, and was used to transport logs from the vast forest of Northwest Michigan to sawmills in Manistee and Traverse City. Two years later, new railroads were extended out of Traverse City. One line was extended along the bay into Leelanau County, and curved south to a preexisting spur at Lake Ann. Another line was extended east into present-day Williamsburg, and to Charlevoix and Petoskey. This railroad was largely to serve tourists.

In 1881, the Northern Michigan Asylum, later the Traverse City State Hospital, was established as the demand for a third psychiatric hospital in Michigan, in addition to those established in Kalamazoo and Pontiac, began to grow. Perry Hannah, by then a prominent Michigan Republican, used his political influence to secure its location in Traverse City. Under the supervision of prominent architect Gordon W. Lloyd, the first building, known as Building 50, was constructed in Victorian-Italianate style according to the Kirkbride Plan. The hospital opened in 1885 with 43 residents. Under Dr. James Decker Munson, the first superintendent from 1885 to 1924, the institution expanded. Twelve housing cottages and two infirmaries were built between 1887 and 1903 to meet the specific needs of male and female patients. The institution became the city's largest employer and contributed to its growth. While the hospital was established for the care of the mentally ill, its use expanded during outbreaks of tuberculosis, typhoid, diphtheria, influenza, and polio. It also cared for the elderly, served as a rehab for drug addicts, and was used to train nurses.

On May 18, 1895, Traverse City was incorporated as a city. Perry Hannah served as the first mayor of Traverse City, after also serving as first and third village president.

20th century
The first National Cherry Festival was held in Traverse City in 1925. It was first called "Blessing of the Blossoms" and held in the spring to attract people during the blooming season. With the exception of the years before and during World War II, this tradition has been carried on since in Traverse City. The legislature moved the date of the festival to the summer, and it attracts tourists from around the state. During the week the festival takes place, the population of Traverse City rises from about 15,000 to about 500,000. In 2004 the legislature added "Blossom Days", again as a spring festival.

Also in 1925, Munson Medical Center opened, and has since grown to serve much of Northern Michigan and serves as one of Traverse City's largest employers.

In 1929, Traverse City's first airport, Ransom Field, opened, offering flights to Grand Rapids. It closed in 1936, when the new Traverse City Airport (now called Cherry Capital Airport) was opened. In 1953 the grounds of Ransom Field were redeveloped as Memorial Gardens Cemetery.

In 1934, the original Traverse City High School building burnt down, with no casualties. For three years, while the high school was being rebuilt, classes were moved to the Perry Hannah House, the former residence of the city's founder. Classes were moved back to the new school building in September 1937. In 1960, the high school was moved from downtown Traverse City to a new college-style campus on the grounds of Northwestern Michigan College, which opened a few years prior in 1951. The former high school building was converted to Traverse City Junior High. In 1997, the high school split into Traverse City Central and Traverse City West High Schools due to extreme overcrowding at the 1960s building.

In 1989, the Traverse City State Hospital closed, leaving hundreds without jobs, massive abandoned buildings, and many homeless former patients. Since 2000, the Minervini Group has undertaken the project of renovating the entire property into a social center, including many restaurants, retail spaces, office space, and residential space.

21st century 
In 2005, Michigan filmmaker Michael Moore organized the first Traverse City Film Festival in downtown Traverse City. In 2015 and 2016, Traverse City was called the best small town in America by Livability.com.

On November 3, 2015, Traverse City elected Jim Carruthers, its first openly gay mayor. After serving as mayor of Traverse City for 6 years, in June 2021 Jim Carruthers announced he would not run for his 4th mayoral term.

May 18, 2020, served as the city's 125th anniversary of Traverse City's incorporation as a city in 1895, and was known as the "quarantine quasquicentennial".

On June 1, 2020, commissioners of Traverse City approved a plan that would close two blocks of Front Street and return State Street to two-way traffic, until Labor Day of that year. This was enacted in order to prevent crowding in reopening businesses following the COVID-19 pandemic. This followed the cancelation of the 2020 National Cherry Festival and Traverse City Film Festival.

On November 2, 2020, President Donald Trump and Vice President Mike Pence appeared at a campaign rally at Traverse City's Cherry Capital Airport, the day before the 2020 election.

In April 2021, a group composed mostly of White students from two Traverse City area school districts held an online mock slave auction via social media app in a private group chat titled "Slave Trade", wherein they traded their Black student peers for monetary amounts while using derogatory language. After the local community was made aware of this event, a coalition of community members and Traverse City Area Public School (TCAPS) Board of Education officials drafted in response a resolution which denounced the behavior. The draft of the resolution itself led to community backlash initiated largely by White conservative parents and community members who regarded the planned resolution to be "...interlaced with critical race theory". In the aftermath of the backlash, the resolution was edited by TCAPS school board officials. No date for consideration of the revised resolution has been set.

Geography

Topography 
Traverse City is a part of the greater Northern Michigan region, located in the northwest of Michigan's Lower Peninsula. The city is the main inland port of Grand Traverse Bay, a long, natural harbor separated from the waters of Lake Michigan by the Leelanau Peninsula. The bay is divided into an East Arm and West Arm by the Old Mission Peninsula, a thin strip of rolling hills and farmland known for its cherry crop and viticulture industry. As Traverse City contains shores on both of Grand Traverse Bay's East and West Arms, one cannot access the Old Mission Peninsula without entering Traverse City.

The Boardman River is a prominent river bisecting Traverse City from south to north. It also snakes through Traverse City's downtown district, effectively forming a peninsula, and dividing it from the Grandview Parkway. The river terminates at the Grand Traverse Bay northeast of downtown Traverse City. It is also a state-designated "Natural River". As of 2023, only one of the five dams constructed on the Boardman River remains.

Traverse City is surrounded by a substantial suburban ring, especially within Garfield Township, to its southwest. Garfield Township is the largest municipality in Northern Michigan by population. Other adjacent townships, East Bay, Elmwood, and Peninsula, and nearby Blair and Long Lake townships, boast significant suburban populations dependent upon Traverse City.

Layout and cityscape 
Traverse City, like most of Grand Traverse County and many other cities in the United States, is laid out in a grid plan. Major streets run east–west and north–south. 

Traverse City's tallest building is the Park Place Hotel (at 10 stories), although recently, many proposals have been made to build taller buildings. One of these was the River West building, which was canceled in 2017.

Neighborhoods
Traverse City is divided into the following neighborhoods:
 Boardman
 Central
 Downtown
 East Bay
 Fernwood
 Kids Creek
 Midtown Centre
 Oak Park
 Oakwood
 Old Towne
 Orchard Heights
 Slabtown
 Traverse Heights

City parks
Traverse City is home to the following parks:

Superfund site 
Traverse City has one superfund site, according to the Environmental Protection Agency. This is the Avenue E Groundwater Contamination Site. At this location, toxic runoff from the Coast Guard Air Station contaminated the groundwater along Avenue E.

Climate 

Traverse City has a warm-summer continental climate (Köppen Dfb) close to being a hot-summer continental climate (Dfa).

Its location near the 45th parallel is tempered by the strong and moderating effects of Lake Michigan and Grand Traverse Bay, which have a particularly noteworthy effect on the peninsulas that branch north of the city. As a result, they have viticulture and cherry orchards.
Consequently, it generally experiences warm, mild summers and severe winters. Lake Michigan especially, but also Grand Traverse Bay, greatly impact the area's diverse coastal weather patterns, which occasionally consist of sudden and/or large amounts of precipitation during the seasonally active periods. Lake-effect snowfall constitutes a large percentage of the total annual snow accumulation, which averages around 80 inches (203 cm). Periods of snowfall typically last from November to April, although light snow as late as May or as early as late September sometimes occur.

Demographics

2010 census
As of the census of 2010, there were 14,674 people, 6,675 households, and 3,369 families residing in the city. The racial makeup of the city was 94.4% White, 0.7% African American, 1.8% Native American, 0.7% Asian, 0.5% from other races, and 1.9% from two or more races. Hispanic or Latino of any race were 1.9% of the population.

There were 6,675 households, of which 22.3% had children under the age of 18 living with them, 35.6% were married couples living together, 10.9% had a female householder with no husband present, 4.0% had a male householder with no wife present, and 49.5% were non-families. 38.4% of all households were made up of individuals, and 13.3% had someone living alone who was 65 years of age or older. The average household size was 2.08 and the average family size was 2.77.

The median age in the city was 40.8 years. 18.2% of residents were under the age of 18; 10.3% were between the ages of 18 and 24; 26.7% were from 25 to 44; 28.3% were from 45 to 64; and 16.7% were 65 years of age or older. The gender makeup of the city was 47.4% male and 52.6% female.

2000 census
As of the census of 2000, there were 14,532 people, 6,443 households, and 3,485 families residing in the city. The racial makeup of the city was 96.00% White, 0.65% African American, 0.98% Native American, 0.50% Asian, 0.03% Pacific Islander, 0.48% from other races, and 1.36% from two or more races. Hispanic or Latino of any race were 1.67% of the population.

There were 6,443 households, out of which 24.5% had children under the age of 18 living with them, 39.7% were married couples living together, 11.2% had a female householder with no husband present, and 45.9% were non-families. 35.9% of all households were made up of individuals, and 13.7% had someone living alone who was 65 years of age or older. The average household size was 2.15 and the average family size was 2.82.

In the city, the population was spread out, with 20.3% under the age of 18, 10.8% from 18 to 24, 29.6% from 25 to 44, 24.1% from 45 to 64, and 15.2% who were 65 years of age or older. The median age was 38 years. For every 100 females, there were 90.5 males. For every 100 females age 18 and over, there were 87.2 males.

The median income for a household in the city was $37,330, and the median income for a family was $46,912. Males had a median income of $31,587 versus $22,512 for females. The per capita income for the city was $22,247. About 4.8% of families and 8.4% of the population were below the poverty line, including 7.2% of those under age 18 and 7.9% of those age 65 or over.

Religion
Traverse City is part of the Roman Catholic Diocese of Gaylord. It is part of the Episcopal Diocese of Western Michigan and served by Grace Episcopal Church.

Government

Traverse City is a home rule, charter city under the Home Rule Cities Act, incorporated on May 18, 1895. The city is governed by six commissioners and a mayor, elected at-large. Together they compose a seven-member legislative body. The commission appoints a city manager who serves as chief executive for city operations.

As of 2023, the city commission consists of Richard Lewis (mayor), Amy Shamroe (mayor pro tempore), and commissioners Linda Koebert, Mi Stanley, Mitchell Treadwell, Tim Werner, and Mike Wilson.

Traverse City's current mayor, Richard Lewis, was elected to office in 2021, running unopposed. Lewis previously served as Traverse City city manager, and interim city manager of Evart. Lewis identifies as a moderate Democrat.

Traverse City is located within Michigan's 1st congressional district, represented by Jack Bergman (R–Watersmeet). As with the rest of Michigan, it is served by senators Debbie Stabenow and Gary Peters (both Democratic) in the United States Senate. It is represented in the Michigan House of Representatives by Betsy Coffia (D–Traverse City), and is a part of the 103rd district. It is also represented in the Michigan Senate by John Damoose (R–Harbor Springs) and is a part of the 37th senate district.

Education

Public schools
The public school district serving Traverse City is Traverse City Area Public Schools. This district includes 10 elementary schools serving grades Pre-K through 5, two middle schools serving grades 6 through 8, and two high schools serving grades 9 through 12: Traverse City Central and Traverse City West. In addition, the district includes an alternative high school (Traverse City High School) and a montessori elementary school.

Traverse City offers a handful of charter schools, including the Woodland School, the Old Mission Peninsula School, and Grand Traverse Academy.

Vocational career training is offered to high school students within the Traverse Bay Area Intermediate School District at the TBAISD Career Tech Center (CTC), located within just outside Traverse City. Students are bussed to and from their respective high schools to the Career Tech Center daily, and are eligible to receive credit for each. Courses include:

 Agriscience
 Arts & Communication
 Business Management, Marketing & Technology
 Engineering/Manufacturing & Industrial Technology
 Health Services
 Human Services

Private schools
Traverse City offers a number of private schools.

Just outside Traverse City sits the Children's House, an independent montessori school. The Pathfinder School is another independent school near Greilickville.

Religious schools 

Traverse City contains a number of private religious schools

The Grand Traverse Area Catholic Schools district (GTACS) offers students of the area a catholic education, with high school students attending St. Francis High School. Another school is the Traverse City Christian School, offering non-denominational Christian education to Traverse City students. The Trinity Lutheran School offers a lutheran education to K-8 students in Traverse City. Other smaller religious schools include the Traverse Bay Mennonite School and the Traverse City Adventist School.

Higher education

Traverse City is home to Northwestern Michigan College, a two-year community college. Its annual enrollment is around 5,100. One of its campuses is at the Cherry Capital Airport, and offers aviation and auto service classes. Another campus is at the Hagerty Center on Grand Traverse Bay, which is home to Great Lakes Maritime Academy, Great Lakes Culinary Institute, Great Lakes Water Studies Institute, and the Hagerty Conference Center.

Libraries
Traverse City is served by the Traverse Area District Library, which has six branch libraries in Grand Traverse County.

Media

Print
The Traverse City Record-Eagle is one of northwest lower Michigan's daily newspapers. It is circulated in the 13 counties surrounding the city. In December 2006 it was sold by Ottaway Newspapers Inc., the community newspaper subsidiary of Dow Jones & Company to Community Newspaper Holdings, Inc. (CNHI). It is the newspaper of record for Grand Traverse County. Daily editions of the Detroit Free Press, The Detroit News, and The Grand Rapids Press also are available on news stands throughout the region. Other local publications have included Traverse (a monthly regional magazine), NM3 Magazine (a local lifestyle and entertainment publication, no longer published), Grand Traverse Insider (a local weekly community newspaper), Northern Express Weekly, Traverse City Business News, Edible Grande Traverse magazine dedicated to the food, farms and chefs of the area, and Grand Traverse Woman Magazine.

At least seven national magazines were published in Traverse City, including Thirdeye Magazine. Village Press is based in Traverse City; it publishes the Home Shop Machinist, Live Steam and Outdoor Railroading, Machinists' Workshop, Just Labs, Pointing Dog Journal, Retriever Journal and Twin and Turbine magazines.

Traverse City is also the home of Arbutus Press, one of the leading Michigan publishers for regional non-fiction. The company has published many books including four books selected by the Library of Michigan as Michigan Notable Books: Historic Cottages of Mackinac Island (awarded in 2002), Asylum for the Insane: History of Kalamazoo State Hospital (awarded in 2009), Vintage Views Along the West Michigan Pike (awarded in 2012), and Fishtown (awarded in 2013).

Television
Traverse City is the largest city in the Traverse City–Cadillac–Sault Ste. Marie designated market area, the largest television market in area east of the Mississippi River. Accordingly, most stations in this region are broadcast simultaneously on widely spaced transmitters on separate channels, with no difference in their feeds besides FCC-mandated station identification.

Traverse City has two television stations licensed directly to the city:
 Channel 7: WPBN-TV "TV 7&4" (NBC) (simulcast on channel 4, Cheboygan)
 Channel 29: WGTU "ABC 29&8" (ABC) (simulcast on channel 8, Goetzville)

Additionally, WFQX operates a CW Plus station on its second digital subchannel and Northern Michigan cable television systems, branded as “The CW Northern Michigan; prior to 2018 the station was owned by WGTU and was broadcast on their second digital subchannel.

The city also has a low power rebroadcast transmitter of Mount Pleasant's PBS member station, WCMU-TV, operating on virtual channel 27 (WCMV).

Stations licensed to nearby Cadillac are considered local to Traverse City:
 Channel 9: WWTV "9&10 News" (CBS) (simulcast on channel 10, Raber Township, Michigan in the eastern Upper Peninsula)
 Channel 32: WFQX-TV "Local 32" (Fox) (simulcast on channel 45, Vanderbilt)

Fox's sister network, MyNetworkTV, did not have an affiliate in the market when it launched back in September 2006. This changed in 2008 when WLLZ-LP channel 12 (now WXII-LD) added the network.

Cable television service is provided within Traverse City and many outlying communities by Charter Spectrum. Public-access television cable TV programming is provided on channel 189.

Radio

Traverse City is the home of Northern Michigan talk radio station WTCM News/Talk 580 AM. Other talk stations available in the Traverse City area include WJML, WMKT, WSRT, and WLDR. AM 1310 ESPN Radio (operated by WCCW) broadcasts national ESPN content along with Detroit Pistons, Tigers, Red Wings and Lions games. MSU Football and Basketball can also be heard on 1310.

There are 16  commercial radio stations in a variety of radio formats. WKLT-97.5/98.9-FM is the area's longest serving rock station, known for its show Lunch at the Leetsville Cafe with Terri Ray, and the iconic Giant Red Radio party trailer. WNMC 90.7 FM is a community public radio station that is committed to a wide variety of musical genres and local events, with a broadcast focus on jazz, blues, and world music.

Traverse City has three religious radio stations: W201CM (a translator at 88.1) and WLJN AM/FM 89.9 FM and 1400 AM. In 2014 WLJN added another frequency at 95.9 playing contemporary Christian music 24 hours a day.

Interlochen Center for the Arts broadcasts the NPR member station dubbed Interlochen Public Radio. it serves a large portion of Northwest Lower Michigan via two stations:
88.7 is music and 91.5 is talk.

WLDR was for 10 years Sunny Country 101.9 until October 22, 2014, when the station switched back to an adult contemporary format. The station went on the air in 1966 with owner Roderick Maxson serving the Grand Traverse area and surrounding counties. They were the first to broadcast in HD radio in Michigan. They have been the sponsor for several major events in Traverse City, including The Beach Bum Games, Horses by the Bay, the Make-A-Wish Motorcycle Tour, and the Traverse City Easter Egg Hunt.

Culture

Most of Traverse City's economy is based on tourism. As part of the 2011 tourism advertising campaign the Traverse City Visitors Bureau, Traverse City Cherry Capital Airport and local businesses sponsored a video to be played on all Delta flights to and from Cherry Capital Airport in the month of June 2011. The National Cherry Festival, usually in the first week of July, tends to host hundreds of thousands of tourists and locals to the area, as does the Traverse City Film Festival (established in 2005) at the end of July. It has become a focal point within the craft brewing trend. In November Beer Week is celebrated, with tours of breweries including samplings of craft brews, dinners and workshops.

The National Cherry Festival, held during the first full week of July every year, is a draw for tourists to Traverse City. The festival features parades, fireworks, an air show, election of festival royalty, live music, a pie-eating contest and cherries. The largest variety of cherry produced locally is the Montmorency cherry, or the "pie cherry". Other cherries grown in the region include the Ulster, or sweet cherry, and the Balaton (from Lake Balaton in Hungary), a cherry situated between the Montmorency and Ulster in terms of color and taste.

The Traverse City Film Festival, held at the end of July and beginning of August every year since 2005, is another draw for tourists and film buffs to Traverse City. The festival was started by Michael Moore, Doug Stanton and John Robert Williams as a way to bring more culture into the area via cinema.

The locale and topography is conducive for road bicycling, aided by the TART trail system. A map with routes, different trips, advice and local knowledge is available. Lake Michigan presents a location for sailing, fishing, and kayaking.

The Traverse City State Park, with about 250 campsites, is located three miles (4.8 km) east of downtown on  including a quarter mile beach on the East Bay arm of Grand Traverse Bay.

The Boardman River Nature Center is the interpretive center and management headquarters for the Grand Traverse Natural Education Reserve, a 505-acre local park and natural area.

The sandy soil is conducive to viticulture, and there are over 50 wineries in the Traverse City area. Most offer free wine tasting. Traverse City is located at the base of the Old Mission Peninsula wine region.

Performing arts and exhibits
The City Opera House, located in downtown Traverse City features plays, movies, and other performances.

The Traverse Symphony Orchestra (TSO), founded in 1952 by community leader Elnora Milliken as the Northwestern Michigan Symphony Orchestra, has grown from a small group of volunteer musicians to a paid professional orchestra of 60 contracted members. There was a connection over the years with Interlochen Center for the Arts, providing a core of musicians and conductors from among faculty and students. Until 1985 it was known as the Northwestern Michigan Symphony Orchestra.

The Dennos Museum Center, located on the campus of Northwestern Michigan College, is home to a collection of Inuit art including sculpture, drawing and prints. The center is also home to an interactive gallery, as well as various ongoing exhibitions in their large exhibition space. The museum expanded in 2017 and added two new wings of galleries to display art from its permanent collection (both of Inuit art and non-Inuit art).

Historical markers

There are eleven recognized Michigan historical markers in the Traverse City area. They are:
 Bingham District No. 5 Schoolhouse
 City Opera House
 Congregation Beth El
 Grand Traverse Bay
 Grand Traverse County Courthouse
 Great Lakes Sport Fishery
 Ladies Library Association
 Novotny's Saloon
 Park Place Hotel
 Perry Hannah House
 Traverse City State Hospital

Viticulture
Traverse City was named by USA Today among the Top Ten Places for Local Wine. There are nine wineries on the Old Mission Peninsula and 21 wineries on the Leelanau Peninsula, both just a few minutes drive from downtown Traverse City. Both peninsulas sit close to the 45th parallel, a latitude known for growing prestigious grapes. The two arms of Grand Traverse Bay provide the ideal maritime climate and the rich glacial soil does the rest. Northern Michigan specializes in growing white grapes and is known for its Rieslings which grow well in the summer months and late fall which Traverse City is known for. Every October the wineries host a harvest fest. Some Riesling grapes are spared being picked in the fall to be picked when they freeze, from which ice wine is made. The wineries along the Old Mission Peninsula are Black Star Farms, 2 Lads Winery, Bowers Harbor Vineyards, Brys Estate Vineyard & Winery, Chateau Chantal Winery And Inn, Chateau Grand Traverse, Bonobo Winery, Mari Vineyards, and Peninsula Cellars. The wineries along the Leelanau Peninsula are Black Star Farms, Leelenau Cellars, Silver Leaf Vineyard and Winery, Gill's Pier Vineyard and Winery, Raftshol Vineyards, Circa Estate Winery, Forty-Five North Vineyard and Winery, Good Harbor Vineyards, Chateau Fontaine, Boskydel Vineyards, L. Mawby Vineyards, Ciccone Vineyard and Winery, Willow Vineyards, Chateau de Leelanau Vineyard and Winery, Shady Lane Cellars, Cherry Republic Winery, Longview Winery, Boathouse Winery, Verterra, Brengman Brothers, Bel Lago Winery, and Rove Estate Vineyard and Winery.

Sports 
Traverse City is home to many public sporting facilities. These include the Grand Traverse County Civic Center, which is a large sports complex in the heart of the city, housing seven baseball/softball fields, a skatepark, a mile-long walk trail, an amphitheater, sledding hill, pavilion, playground, an indoor pool, and an indoor hockey rink. Other complexes include the Grand Traverse Bay YMCA, four complexes that offer public swimming, soccer, and tennis. The Huntington Rink indoor arena is used primarily for ice hockey, and is the home of the Traverse City North Stars hockey team. Many of the city parks in Traverse City also offer volleyball, soccer, and basketball.

During their annual offseason, the Detroit Red Wings of the National Hockey League hold their training camp at Traverse City's Centre Ice Arena. In addition to training camp every September, the Red Wings host an NHL Prospect Tournament, consisting of prospects of participating teams around the league. In 2021, the Traverse City Prospect Tournament consisted of players from the Detroit Red Wings, Toronto Maple Leafs, Columbus Blue Jackets, Dallas Stars, and St. Louis Blues. The Red Wings' influence in Traverse City goes beyond training camp, however; multiple former Red Wings have lived in Traverse City, including Dallas Drake and the legendary Gordie Howe. For this reason, Traverse City is often referred to as Hockeytown North, in reference to Detroit's popular nickname, Hockeytown.

Economy
Traverse City is home to a number of local businesses including Hagerty Insurance Agency and Munson Medical Center. There is a significant manufacturing presence, as well. In recent years, the city has developed a growing technology industry, with numerous tech start-ups, a startup incubator, podcasts, and breweries. Traverse City and its micropolitan area are known for their small business, which bring in a multitude of people during the summer months.

Traverse City's central business district is located along Front Street downtown. Another major shopping district is on US 31 southwest of town, where several big box stores are located, as well as a shopping malls, the Grand Traverse Mall, anchored by Target, JCPenney, Macy's. The Buffalo Ridge Shopping Center is also on US 31 about a mile northwest of the Grand Traverse Mall. Another mall, the Cherryland Center, is located on Garfield Avenue on the south end of town; this mall features Big Lots. Two Meijer stores, one Walmart, one Sam's Club, one Costco, one Target, one Menards, and a multitude of local grocery store chains offer grocery and other options to big-box shopping.

Transportation

Airports

With a new terminal completed in 2004, Cherry Capital Airport provides regularly scheduled passenger airline service to Chicago and Detroit, with seasonal flights to Dallas-Fort Worth, Minneapolis-Saint Paul, Atlanta, New York City, Denver, Boston, Mesa, Ponte Vedra, St. Petersburg, Orlando, and Newark. It is the fourth largest airport in Michigan. Around the area, there are smaller nearby paved and unpaved airports.

Ships and boats
 Adjacent to the airport is Coast Guard Air Station Traverse City, responsible for both maritime and land-based search and rescue operations in the northern Great Lakes region. On April 7, 2010, the USCG designated Traverse City a Coast Guard City. Traverse City is the second city in Michigan and tenth in the country to receive this honor.
 Located in the harbor of the Great Lakes Maritime Academy is the T/S State of Michigan, a  former Navy submarine surveillance vessel. The vessel is used as a classroom and laboratory while cadets of the academy are underway and shore side.
 A tall ship, the schooner Manitou is berthed at Traverse City, and offers passages to the public.
 Near Traverse City, there are two other tall ships, the schooner Madeline and the  replica of the sloop Welcome, an 18th-century British warship sloop, which was built for the 1976 Bicentennial of the American Revolution. They are the only two boats recognized by the State of Michigan for their historic significance. From May through October, trained volunteers conduct tours (when in port), and give a history of the boats and Great Lakes sailing. The Madeline is berthed at Elmwood Township "Coal Dock" (Heritage Harbor), West Bayshore, just south of the Elmwood Township Marina Both are maintained by the Maritime Heritage Alliance.
 The Nauti-Cat, a 43-passenger catamaran books passages on Grand Traverse bay. They offer cruises seven days a week, four times a day.

Buses
The area is served by Indian Trails Bus service, an intercity bus system that connects to St. Ignace to the north and to Grand Rapids and Kalamazoo to the south. The bus station is located at 107 Hall Street with connection to the BATA transfer station.

Traverse City also has a public transportation system, the Bay Area Transportation Authority (BATA) which serves most of the Grand Traverse and Leelanau region. With link services and a fixed route bus service, called the Loops, serves Traverse City and the urbanized areas of Garfield Township. BATA put into service its first hybrid bus in December 2005. BATA's downtown bus transfer terminal on Hall Street opened July 21, 2006. The terminal is used to transfer riders to different buses on different routes.

Major highways

  is a major north–south highway, and serves as the primary thoroughfare through Traverse City. US 31 enters Michigan from Indiana, and runs through communities such as Benton Harbor, Holland, Grand Haven, Muskegon, Ludington, Manistee, Charlevoix, and Petoskey. Throughout its route, US 31 parallels the coast of Lake Michigan.
  is a scenic highway that parallels the shore of Grand Traverse Bay and Lake Michigan. The highway begins at an intersection in Traverse City, and runs north through Greilickville and Suttons Bay, before turning back south along Lake Michigan, through communities such as Leland, Glen Arbor, Empire, Frankfort, and Onekama, before ending at US 31 near Manistee.
  is a north–south highway. Largely following the route of US 31 in Traverse City, M-37 exits to the north, running about  up the Old Mission Peninsula before terminating at a cul-de-sac near the Mission Point Lighthouse. South of Traverse City, M-37 runs through communities such as Mesick, Baldwin, Grand Rapids, Hastings, and Battle Creek.
  is an east–west highway that traverses the width of the Lower Peninsula. Beginning at M-22 in Empire, M-72 follows the Grandview Parkway in Traverse City, and continues east toward communities such as Kalkaska, Grayling, Mio, and Harrisville on Lake Huron.

Railroads
The Great Lakes Central Railroad (GLCR) provides freight rail service to the Traverse City area on track owned by the state of Michigan. The tracks were once owned by the Chesapeake and Ohio Railway (ex-Pere Marquette Railway) and the Pennsylvania Railroad (ex-Grand Rapids and Indiana Railroad) but were purchased by the state in the late 1970s and early 1980s to preserve rail service in the area. Current freight traffic includes fruit/perishables, scrap metal, and lumber.

On February 20, 1982, the Chesapeake and Ohio Railway stopped using the line after the last long train serve Traverse City. Then the railroad was dismantled next year from Manistee to Grawn and from Williamsburg to Charlevoix.

Regular intercity passenger train service ended on October 29, 1966, after the Chesapeake and Ohio Railway (C&O) discontinued Grand Rapids–Traverse City service. In earlier years, the PM and C&O's Resort Special and other trains went north to Petoskey and Bay View. Since then, excursion passengers trains have operated in and out of Traverse City on an irregular basis. Recently, Lake Central Rail Tours has operated a summer excursion during the Cherry Festival until 2008. On May 11, 1996, the Grand Traverse Dinner Train began year round service from the Traverse City depot to Williamsburg and to Walton Junction. Dinner train service was suspended in 2004 after a contract dispute with the Tuscola and Saginaw Bay Railway and additional difficulties. The train itself was removed to Owosso in mid-July 2006. However, in 2015 a study was started by the Michigan Department of Transportation, and passenger rail is gaining interest.

Sister city
Traverse City has one sister city:

 Tsuchiyama (Koka), Shiga (Japan).

Accolades

Greatest Midwest Town, Midwest Living
Top 100 Best Small Towns, Livability.com
25 Best Small US Cities to Spend the Weekend, Thrillist
Top 20 Small Towns to Visit, Smithsonian.com
Must See American Cities, Horizon Travel Magazine
Destination on the Rise, TripAdvisor
Up-and-Coming Food City, Condé Nast Traveler
14 Best Beach Towns in America, Thrillist
One of 5 Midwestern Small Towns to Visit Now, Fodor's
One of 7 Top Wine Regions to Watch, Touring & Tasting
One of America's Favorite Towns, Travel + Leisure
America's Most Scenic Waterside Drives, Travel + Leisure
Michigan's Three Best Beach Towns, Coastal Living
Top 10 Things for Families to Do in Michigan, Trekaroo.com
Top 7 Beer Destinations in North America, The Travel Channel
One of America's five top foodie towns, Bon Appétit
Sleeping Bear Dunes National Lakeshore: "The Most Beautiful Place in America", Good Morning America Viewers
Top Midwest Travel Spots, TripAdvisor
Top 10 Places to Enjoy Local Wines, USA Today
One of 3 Emerging Beer Towns, Draft Magazine
25 Coolest Midwest Vacation Spots, Midwest Living
Ten Great Boating Towns, BoatUS Magazine
Top 10 Beach Towns in America, AOL Travel News

Notable people

 M. E. C. Bates (1839–1905), writer, journalist, newspaper editor
 Clara Nettie Bates (1876-1966), editor, writer, clubwoman
 Kate Botello, host of TechTV's The Screen Savers and Extended Play, resides in Traverse City, where she owns a web design company
 Mark Brammer, Michigan State University football player, All-America 1978, later played for the NFL's Buffalo Bills
 Mary K. Buck (1849-1901), author
 Chasten Buttigieg, husband of Pete Buttigieg, was born and raised in Traverse City
 Pete Buttigieg, current United States Secretary of Transportation and former mayor of South Bend, Indiana, resides in Traverse City as of July 2022
 Demas T. Craw, posthumous Medal of Honor winner
 Jeremy Davies, actor, featured in Saving Private Ryan, Solaris, Lost, CQ and Justified
 Dallas Drake, NHL player who last played for the Detroit Red Wings; previously with Winnipeg Jets/Phoenix Coyotes, and St. Louis Blues
 Robert P. Griffin, Justice of the Michigan Supreme Court from 1987 to 1994; United States Senator from 1966 to 1979; U.S. Representative from 1957 to 1966; the Grand Traverse County Robert P. Griffin Hall of Justice was dedicated in his honor on November 13, 2006
 Walter Hagen, professional golfer, lived in Traverse City from 1958 to 1969
 Brandon Halverson, professional ice hockey goaltender
 Pearl M. Hart, pioneering Chicago attorney
 Gary Hogeboom, NFL player for the Dallas Cowboys, Indianapolis Colts, Phoenix Cardinals, and Washington Redskins; played for Central Michigan University and Northview High School in Grand Rapids
 Gordie Howe, legendary hockey player, played for Detroit Red Wings and lived in Traverse City from the late 1980s to 1999
 Bob James, jazz musician, created instrumental theme song for TV sitcom Taxi, sampled by numerous hip-hop artists; resident of Traverse City
 Tom Kozelko, NBA basketball player with the Washington Bullets
 Angus MacLellan, professional rugby player with the United States national rugby union team
 Dan Majerle, NBA basketball player who played for the Phoenix Suns, Miami Heat and Cleveland Cavaliers
 Mike Matteucci, NHL player for the Minnesota Wild
 Barbara McGuire, polymer clay artist and author
 Suzy Merchant, coach for Michigan State University women's basketball team
 William G. Milliken, Republican Governor of Michigan from 1969 to 1983
 Doug Mirabelli, MLB player for the Boston Red Sox, San Diego Padres, Texas Rangers and the San Francisco Giants
 Michael Moore, filmmaker, local resident, supporter of the renovation of the State Theatre and Traverse City Film Festival
 Matt Noveskey, musician in the bands Blue October and (a+) machines
 Bunny Oakes, head football coach at the University of Colorado at Boulder from 1935 to 1939, compiled a 25-15-1 (.622) record
 Carter Oosterhouse, carpenter on reality TV show Trading Spaces
 John T. Parsons, pioneered numerical control for machine tools in the 1940s
 Pat Paulsen, actor, comedian, political candidate, co-owner of Cherry County Playhouse theater during the 1970s
 Lawrence Plamondon, 1960s activist
 Zach Redmond, professional hockey player for EHC Red Bull München, team captain at Ferris State
 Brian Rolston, NHL player for the New Jersey Devils, Colorado Avalanche, Boston Bruins, Minnesota Wild and New York Islanders
 Wilson Sawyer, composer and musician 
 Mel Schacher, bassist for Grand Funk Railroad
 John Scott, 2016 NHL All-Star MVP
 Bernice Steadman, aviator and member of the Mercury 13
 Martha Teichner, television news correspondent for CBS News, born in Traverse City in 1948
 The Accidentals, Indie folk band formed in Traverse City
 Craig Thompson, cartoonist and graphic novelist, best known for Blankets
 Barry Watson, actor, known for TV series 7th Heaven and Samantha Who?
 David Wayne, film, television and Tony Award-winning stage actor, Adam's Rib, The Tender Trap, The Andromeda Strain, Ellery Queen, Batman
 Ezra Winter, muralist

See also
 Cherry production in Michigan
 Former Traverse City State Hospital, historical Kirkbride Building
 Munson Medical Center, regional medical referral center serving patients from 32 counties in Northern Michigan and the Upper Peninsula
 Watershed Center Grand Traverse Bay

Notes

References

Footnotes

Works cited

Further reading

 Clarke Historical Library, Central, Michigan University, Bibliography for Leelanau County
 
 
 
 

 Critical Race Theory in Traverse City

External links

 City of Traverse City official website
 

 
.
Cities in Grand Traverse County, Michigan
County seats in Michigan
Cities in Leelanau County, Michigan
Michigan populated places on Lake Michigan
Coastal resorts in Michigan
Populated places established in 1847
1847 establishments in Michigan